Diadumenian (14September 208 – June 218) was the son of the Roman Emperor Macrinus, and served as his co-ruler for a brief time in 218. Diadumenian became  in May 217, shortly after his father's accession to the imperial throne. Elagabalus, a relative of the recently deceased Emperor Caracalla, revolted in May of the following year, and Diadumenian was elevated to co-emperor. After Macrinus was defeated in the Battle of Antioch on 8 June 218, Diadumenian was sent to the court of Artabanus IV of Parthia to ensure his safety; however, he was captured and executed along the way. After his death and that of his father, the Senate declared both of them enemies of Rome and had their names struck from records and their images destroyed – a process called .

History
Diadumenian was born on 14 September 208, named Marcus Opellius Diadumenianus, to Macrinus, the praetorian prefect and future emperor of Berber origin. The , a collection of biographies of Roman emperors, mistakenly names Diadumenian as "Diadumenus". The same source also states that Diadumenian's mother was Nonia Celsa, though this name may have been invented by the author of the text.

Macrinus declared himself emperor on 11 April 217, three days after Emperor Caracalla was assassinated. Shortly after, the eight-year-old Diadumenian was elevated to formalising his position as heir to the throneat Zeugma, while his guard was escorting him from Antioch to Mesopotamia to join his father. He was also given the name Antoninus, in honour of the Antonine dynasty, at this time. On 16 May 218 a revolt against him and his father was launched in Emesa by Elagabalus, whose mother, Julia Soaemias, was Caracalla's cousin. In order to put down the revolt, Macrinus led his legions to a fort at Apamea. After Macrinus was defeated by Elagabalus on 8 June 218, at the Battle of Antioch, Macrinus fled north and then to the Bosporus. Before fleeing he entrusted Diadumenian to loyal servants, instructing them to take him into the Parthian Empire, to the court of Artabanus IV, to ensure his safety. Diadumenian was captured en route in Zeugma, and executed in late June. His head was brought to Elagabalus, and reportedly kept as a trophy.

Following the demise of both Macrinus and Diadumenian, the Roman Senate quickly proclaimed their support for Elagabalus, declaring the former emperors to be enemies of the state. Elagabalus, in an attempt to wipe out all traces of Diadumenian and his father, dated his reign to the end of that of Caracalla. Surviving busts of Diadumenian are mangled, with the facial features barely being discernible.

Numismatics
While , a large number of coins were struck for Diadumenian, although fewer than the amount struck for his father. This has led to the suggestion, first proposed by ancient numismatist Curtis Clay, that a large issue of coins was being made for Diadumenian, however, they were quickly melted down when the news of Macrinus' defeat spread. Notably, some eastern provincial coins from the period exist which give Diadumenian the title , at the time the Greek equivalent of the Roman . In terms of gold coins, Diadumenian has one known style of aureus, bearing his image on the obverse, and displaying Spes standing on the reverse, and one known style of half-aureus, bearing his image on the obverse, and displaying himself holding a sceptre and standard.

References

Citations

Bibliography

 

 
 

 

208 births
218 deaths
3rd-century Berber people
3rd-century executions
3rd-century murdered monarchs
3rd-century Roman emperors
Berber rulers
Severan dynasty
Opellii
Executed Roman emperors
Ancient child monarchs
Monarchs who died as children
Year of birth unknown
People executed by the Roman Empire
Executed children
Sons of Roman emperors
Sons of emperors
Roman pharaohs